The Connacht Tribune (An Curadh Connachtach) is a newspaper circulating chiefly in County Galway, Ireland.

The main regional newspaper for the county, the Tribune Group prints two titles every week - the Connacht Tribune on Thursday and the Galway City Tribune on Friday. Connacht Tribune Group newspapers are circulated in every district of the City and every town and village in the County. As of January 2007, its weekly readership is over 150,000.

History
In 1925, the Connacht Tribune stable began publishing the Connacht Sentinel, which was joined in 1984 by the Galway City Tribune. The Connacht Sentinel ceased publication in 2014. Since then, the Connacht Tribune has focused mainly on news relating to the county of Galway. In addition to a number of staff journalists, the paper also employs a number of reporters around the county for specific regional coverage.

John Cunningham was editor from 1984 to 2007.

As of 2004, former hurler John McIntyre was sports editor of the Connacht Tribune.

In 2006 the newspaper purchased Galway's local radio station, Galway Bay FM. 

In 2014, the final edition of the Connacht Sentinel was published. 

The Tribunes archives are available online to view any issue of the Connacht Tribune since its inception in 1909. The archive is free of charge for the first two visits here.

Staff
The editor of the Connacht Tribune is Dave O'Connell and the Galway City Tribunes editor is Enda Cunningham. The Chairman is Peter Allen.

References

External links

Galway (city)
Mass media in County Galway
Newspapers published in the Republic of Ireland
Weekly newspapers published in Ireland